Park Square Historic District is a historic district located at Franklinville in Cattaraugus County, New York. The district encompasses the historic core of the village of Franklinville and include the landscaped village green, brickpaved streets, and the commercial or civic buildings fronting on the square or located immediately adjacent to it. Significant buildings range in date from 1828 to 1924 and reflect a variety of 19th-century and early 20th-century architectural styles including Queen Anne, Italianate, and Classical Revival styles. The village square was established in 1876.  The district contains 21 contributing buildings and 2 contributing structures.

It was listed on the National Register of Historic Places in 1986.

Gallery

References

External links

Historic districts on the National Register of Historic Places in New York (state)
Queen Anne architecture in New York (state)
Neoclassical architecture in New York (state)
Italianate architecture in New York (state)
Historic districts in Cattaraugus County, New York
National Register of Historic Places in Cattaraugus County, New York